Anima: Gate of Memories is an action role-playing video game developed by the independent game studio Anima Project and published by Badland Indie. The game is based of the Spanish tabletop role-playing game Anima: Beyond Fantasy.

Gameplay
Anima: Gate of Memories is a third-person action RPG, with both combat and exploration. The game is open world and players can explore the world of Gaia and pick which tasks they complete, which in turn will impact the game's ending. The players are able to control the characters of The Bearer and Ergo Mundus. Only one of the two characters can fight at a time, however players can freely switch between them during fights.

Soundtrack
The soundtrack is developed by Damian Sanchez and Marc Celma. Sanchez is a music composer, producer, sound designer and audio director of his own music production company based in Valencia, Spain, while Celma is a composer with a career of 15 years in the doom metal band Mentat.

Reception

Anima: Gate of Memories received mixed reviews. The praises were especially for the longevity, the environments and the soundtrack, while the critics were especially for the uncooperative camera, the bad tutorials and the voice acting.

References

External links
Official website (archived)

2016 video games
Action role-playing video games
Crowdfunded video games
Kickstarter projects
Linux games
PlayStation 4 games
PlayStation Network games
Video games based on tabletop role-playing games
Video games developed in Spain
Video games with Steam Workshop support
Windows games
Xbox One games